Edward Joseph Conway FRS (3 July 1894 – 29 December 1968) was an Irish biochemist known for works pertaining to electrolyte physiology and analytical chemistry.

Education
Conway was born in Nenagh, North Tipperary and educated at Blackrock College and University College Dublin, graduating M.Sc.. After winning a studentship to the University of Frankfurt am Main, where he was awarded D.Sc., he returned to Ireland to become the first Professor of Biochemistry and Pharmacology at University College Dublin in 1932, a post he held until 1963.

Research
Conway was one of Ireland's most distinguished scientists; he was a world authority on electrolyte physiology, and in general on the physiology of the inorganic constituents of living tissue. He published over 120 papers, as well as two books: Microdiffusion Analysis and Volumetric Error and The Biochemistry of Gastric Acid Secretion.

Awards
Conway was elected a Fellow of the Royal Society in 1947, his application citation stating that he was "Distinguished for investigations of chemical and physiochemical processes in living tissues, including a quantitative interpretation of the processes underlying potassium accumulation in isolated muscle, with applications to resting potentials and related questions; the exact determination of blood ammonia, the ammonia increase in shed blood, and studies of the deaminase involved; general structural relations of the mammalian kidney, and studies of diffusion rates through tissues; biochemical studies of yeast fermentation in relation to cationic exchanges and production of free hydrochloric acid; bio-geochemical study of oceanic evolution; new methods of micro-diffusion analysis".

In 1967 he was the recipient of the prestigious Royal Dublin Society's Boyle Medal. UCD's new Conway Institute of Biomolecular and Biomedical Research, which opened in August 2003, was named in his honour.

References

1894 births
1968 deaths
People from Nenagh
Irish biochemists
Irish biologists
Fellows of the Royal Society
People educated at Blackrock College
Alumni of University College Dublin
20th-century biologists